Samuel Hickson was an English footballer who played as a forward for Belgian club Liège between 1895 and 1903. He was topscorer in the Belgian First Division in the 1895–96 and 1896–97 seasons.

References

Year of birth missing
Date of death missing
English footballers
Association football forwards
RFC Liège players
Belgian Pro League players
English expatriate footballers
English expatriate sportspeople in Belgium
Expatriate footballers in Belgium